Joe Raad (born February 4, 1985, in Beirut) is a Lebanese singer, composer, music director, and songwriter.

Discography

Studio albums 
2007: Malawe
2008: Berohl
2012: Talei
2014: Nazra Minnak
2015: Aayb Aalli Byaamel Aayb
2015: Ana Bachhadlak
2016: Wesh Endak
2017: Mastah

Live albums 
2014: Nazra Minnak
2015: Aayb Aalli Byaamel Aayb
2015: Ana Bachhadlak
2016: Wesh Endak
2017: Mastah
2018: Hobbak Backwashni
2018: Habib Mawzati

References

External links
 Joe Raad on Anghami (Joe Raad)(EN)
 Official Website of Joe Raad
 An interview with Joe Raad on Sayidaty
 An interview with Joe Raad on Rotana TV

Living people
1984 births
21st-century Lebanese male singers
Male singer-songwriters
Lebanese Sunni Muslims
Lebanese songwriters